1,4-Diazacycloheptane is an organic compound with the formula (CH2)5(NH)2. This cyclic diamine is a colorless oily liquid that is soluble in polar solvents. It is studied as a chelating ligand. The N-H centers can be replaced with many other groups.

It has known use in piperazine pharmaceuticals, for example:
Fasudil
Bunazosin
Homochlorcyclizine
Homopipramol

Related compounds
 1,5-Diazacyclooctane

References

Diamines
Chelating agents